Michael Vrbenský (born 26 December 1999) is a Czech tennis player.

Vrbenský has a career high ATP singles ranking of World No. 282 achieved on 19 July 2021. He also has a career high doubles ranking of World No. 270 achieved on 14 September 2020.

Vrbenský has won 2 ATP Challenger doubles titles at the 2019 Svijany Open and the 2021 ATP Prague Open with Jonáš Forejtek.

Vrbenský made his ATP main draw debut as qualifier at the 2021 Antalya Open with two straight sets victories. He then lost in the first round to former Top 10 member Fabio Fognini in two tight sets.

Challenger and Futures/World Tennis Tour finals

Singles: 12 (8–5)

Doubles: 19 (13–6)

Junior Grand Slam finals

Doubles: 1 (1 runner-up)

References

External links
 
 
Solinco at solincosports.cz

1999 births
Living people
Czech male tennis players
People from Nymburk
Sportspeople from the Central Bohemian Region